Stephen Richards Covey (October 24, 1932 – July 16, 2012) was an American educator, author, businessman, and keynote speaker. His other books include First Things First, Principle-Centered Leadership, The 7 Habits of Highly Effective Families, and The Leader In Me: How Schools and Parents Around the World Are Inspiring Greatness, One Child at a Time. In 1996, Time magazine named him one of the 25 most influential people. He was a professor at the Jon M. Huntsman School of Business at Utah State University (USU) at the time of his death.

Early life and education
Covey was born to Stephen Glenn Covey and Irene Louise Richards Covey in Salt Lake City, Utah, on October 24, 1932. Louise was the daughter of Stephen L Richards, an apostle and counselor in the First Presidency of the Church of Jesus Christ of Latter-day Saints (LDS Church) to David O. McKay. Covey was the grandson of Stephen Mack Covey who founded the original Little America Wyoming near Granger, Wyoming. He was athletic as a youth but suffered from a slipped capital femoral epiphysis in junior high school, requiring him to change his focus to academics and a member of the debate team and graduated from high school early.

Covey earned a bachelor's degree in business administration from the University of Utah, an MBA from the Harvard Business School (HBS), and a Doctor of Religious Education from Brigham Young University (BYU). He was a member of Pi Kappa Alpha fraternity. He was awarded ten honorary doctorates.

Philosophical background
Covey was heavily influenced by Peter Drucker and Carl Rogers. Another key influence on his thinking was his study of American self-help books that he did for his doctoral dissertation. A further influence on Covey was his affiliation with the LDS Church. According to Clayton Christensen, The Seven Habits was a secular distillation of Latter-day Saint values.

Books
Covey's book Spiritual Roots of Human Relations was published in 1970 by Deseret Book Company. Reading this book will identify how Covey's later works were a secular development of these earlier ideas.

The 7 Habits of Highly Effective People

The 7 Habits of Highly Effective People, Covey's best-known book, has sold more than 20 million copies worldwide since its first publication in 1989. The audio version became the first non-fiction audio-book in U.S. publishing history to sell more than one million copies. Covey argues against what he calls "The Personality Ethic", something he sees as prevalent in many modern self-help books. He promotes what he labels "The Character Ethic": aligning one's values with so-called "universal and timeless" principles. Covey adamantly refuses to conflate principles and values; he sees principles as external natural laws, while values remain internal and subjective. Covey proclaims that values govern people's behavior, but principles ultimately determine the consequences. Covey presents his teachings in a series of habits, manifesting as a progression from dependence via independence to interdependence.

The 8th Habit
Covey's 2004 book The 8th Habit: From Effectiveness to Greatness was published by Free Press, an imprint of Simon & Schuster. It is the sequel to The 7 Habits. Covey posits that effectiveness does not suffice in what he calls "The Knowledge Worker Age". He says that "[t]he challenges and complexity we face today are of a different order of magnitude." The 8th habit essentially urges: "Find your voice and inspire others to find theirs."

The Leader in Me
Covey released The Leader in Me: How Schools and Parents Around the World Are Inspiring Greatness, One Child at a Time in November 2008. It tells how "some schools, parents and business leaders are preparing the next generation to meet the great challenges and opportunities of the 21st Century. It shows how an elementary school in Raleigh, North Carolina, decided to try incorporating The 7 Habits of Highly Effective People and other basic leadership skills into the curriculum in unique and creative ways. Inspired by the success of Principal Muriel Summers and the teachers and staff of A.B. Combs Elementary School in Raleigh, other schools and parents around the world have adopted the approach and have seen remarkable results".

Other projects

Franklin Covey
In 1985 Covey established Stephen R. Covey and Associates which in 1987 became The "Covey Leadership Center" which, in 1997, merged with Franklin Quest to form FranklinCovey, a global professional-services firm and specialty retailer selling both training and productivity tools to individuals and to organizations. Their mission statement reads: "We enable greatness in people and organizations everywhere".

In 2009 Covey launched a career development webinar series to help people struggling in the economic downturn. Its purpose was to offer timely and current topics on a regular basis.

Stephen Covey Online Community
In March 2008, Covey launched the Stephen Covey's Online Community. The site was a collection of online courses, goal management and social networking. Covey used it to teach his thoughts and ideas on current topics and self leadership.

The site was withdrawn time after his death.

Academia
Covey was a professor at the Marriott School of Management at BYU for several years, helping to establish the Master of Organizational Behavior program, which has since been merged into the MBA program. While at BYU Covey served as an assistant to the university president.

During the late part of his life, Covey returned to academia as a professor at the Huntsman School of Business at USU, holding the Huntsman Presidential Chair.

Education Initiatives
Covey developed his 2008 book The Leader in Me into several education-related projects. On April 20, 2010, he made his first post to an education blog entitled "Our Children and the Crisis in Education" which appears on the Huffington Post news and blog-aggregation website. FranklinCovey also established a Web site dedicated exclusively to The Leader in Me concept, and it holds periodic conferences and workshops to train elementary school administrators who want to integrate The Leader in Me process into their school's academic culture.

Personal

Family
Covey lived with his wife, Sandra Merrill Covey, and their family in Provo, Utah, home to BYU, where Covey taught prior to the publication of his best-selling book. Parents of nine children and grandparents of fifty-five, Stephen Covey received the Fatherhood Award from the National Fatherhood Initiative in 2003.

Covey's grandson, Britain, played college football at his alma mater, University of Utah, and signed as an undrafted free agent to the Philadelphia Eagles following the 2022 NFL Draft.

Religion
Covey was a practicing member of the LDS Church. He served a two-year mission in England for the Church. Beginning in July 1962, Covey served as the first president of the church's Irish Mission. Starting in 1973, Covey served for a time as a mission representative of the Quorum of the Twelve, where he oversaw training of missionaries in missions in the eastern United States.

When Covey studied as an MBA student at HBS, he would, on occasion, preach to crowds on Boston Common.

Covey authored several devotional works for Latter-day Saint readers, including:
Spiritual Roots of Human Relations (1970)
The Divine Center (1982)
6 Events: The Restoration Model for Solving Life's Problems (2004).

Injuries and death
In April 2012, Covey was riding a bike in Rock Canyon Park in Provo, Utah, when he lost control and fell. He was wearing a helmet but according to his daughter, the helmet slipped and his head hit the pavement. She said said Covey "went down a hill too fast and flipped forward on the bike. It was a pretty big goose egg on the top of his head." Covey also suffered cracked ribs and a partially collapsed lung.

Covey died from complications resulting from the bike accident at the Eastern Idaho Regional Medical Center in Idaho Falls, Idaho, on July 16, 2012, at the age of 79.

Honors and awards
The Thomas More College Medallion for continuing service to humanity
The National Entrepreneur of the Year Lifetime Achievement Award for Entrepreneurial Leadership
The 1994 International Entrepreneur of the Year Award
One of Time Magazine'''s 25 most influential Americans of 1996
The Sikh's 1998 International Man of Peace Award
2003 Fatherhood Award from the National Fatherhood Initiative
2004 Golden Gavel award from Toastmasters International
Accepted the inaugural Corporate Core Values Award from the California University of Pennsylvania on behalf of the FranklinCovey Corporation at the "national Franklin Covey Conference" (December 2006).
Inducted into the Utah Valley Entrepreneurial Forum Hall of Fame on November 14, 2009
Maharishi Award from Maharishi University of Management in Fairfield, Iowa
Aman2020 Award from Aman Wolde foundation in Addis Ababa, Ethiopia.
WorksSpiritual Roots of Human Relations (1970)How to Succeed with People (1971) 
The Divine Center (1982)
The 7 Habits of Highly Effective People (1989, 2004)
Principle Centered Leadership (1989)
First Things First (1994), co-authored with Roger and Rebecca Merrill
The 7 Habits of Highly Effective Families : building a beautiful family culture in a turbulent world (1997)
Quest: The Spiritual Path to Success (Editor) (1997) with Thomas Moore, Mark Victor Hansen, David Whyte, Bernie Siegel, Gabrielle Roth and Marianne Williamson. Simon & Schuster AudioBook 
Living the 7 Habits (2000)
6 Events: The Restoration Model for Solving Life's Problems (2004)
The 8th Habit: From Effectiveness to Greatness (2004)
The Speed of Trust: The One Thing That Changes Everything (2006), Stephen M. R. Covey, co-authored with Rebecca Merrill; foreword by Stephen R. Covey
The Leader in Me: How Schools and Parents Around the World Are Inspiring Greatness, One Child At a Time (2008)
The 7 Habits of Highly Effective Network Marketing Professionals (2009)
The 3rd Alternative: Solving Life's Most Difficult Problems (2011)
The Leader in Me: How Schools Around the World Are Inspiring Greatness, One Child at a Time (Second Edition) (2014)

References

External links

Stephen Covey's official site
FranklinCovey's official site

1932 births
2012 deaths
American business writers
American company founders
American self-help writers
Brigham Young University alumni
Brigham Young University faculty
Harvard Business School alumni
Mission presidents (LDS Church)
American Mormon missionaries in England
American Mormon missionaries in Ireland
Businesspeople from Salt Lake City
David Eccles School of Business alumni
Utah State University faculty
Writers from Salt Lake City
20th-century Mormon missionaries
American motivational writers
Leadership scholars
Latter Day Saints from Utah
Latter Day Saints from Massachusetts
American expatriates in the Republic of Ireland